The Episcopal Diocese of West Texas is the diocese of the Episcopal Church in the United States of America whose territory comprises the southernmost part of the state of Texas.

Territory
The see city is San Antonio, and the diocese includes the cities of Corpus Christi, and Brownsville. (The westernmost part of Texas, including El Paso, is actually part of the Episcopal Diocese of the Rio Grande, which also covers New Mexico.)

History
The Diocese of West Texas was formed on October 26, 1874 when the General Convention of the Episcopal Church voted in favor of the division of the Episcopal Diocese of Texas which led to the formation of the Missionary District of Northern Texas and the Missionary District of Western Texas. The Missionary District of Western Texas was formally established on May 6, 1875. On May 10, 1904, the missionary district was elevated to the status of a diocese, which led to the establishment of the Diocese of West Texas.

Structure
As of 2017, it had 87 churches, 26,000 active baptized members, and an Average Sunday Attendance of 10,592. The diocese and its parishes sponsor twenty-eight parochial schools and preschools, including TMI Episcopal (founded as "West Texas Military Academy"), a boarding college-preparatory school on the outskirts of San Antonio. The diocese was also instrumental in the founding of St. Philip's College, which became a public community college in 1942.

The largest parishes in the diocese are Christ Church, San Antonio, St Mark's, San Antonio, St Luke's, San Antonio and Good Shepherd, Corpus Christi.

The Diocese of West Texas is part of Province VII.

Bishops 
There have been ten diocesan bishops of West Texas and six suffragan bishops:

 Robert W. B. Elliott (1874–1887)
 James Steptoe Johnston (1888–1916)
 William Theodotus Capers (1916–1943)
 Everett Holland Jones (1943–1968) *Richard Earl Dicus, suffragan (1955-1976)
 Harold Cornelius Gosnell (1968–1977)
 Scott Field Bailey (1977–1987) *Stanley F. Hauser, suffragan (1979-1987)
 John Herbert MacNaughton (1987–1995) *Earl N. McArthur, suffragan (1988-1993)
 James E. Folts (1996–2006) *Robert B. Hibbs, suffragan (1996-2003)
 Gary Richard Lillibridge (2006–2017) *David M. Reed, suffragan (2006-2014) *Jennifer Brooke-Davidson, suffragan (2016-2019)
 David M. Reed (2017-present)

The diocese does not have a church designated as its cathedral; the diocesan offices are in the Bishop Jones Center in San Antonio.

References

External links
Episcopal Diocese of West Texas website
Journal of the Annual Council, Diocese of West Texas

West Texas
West Texas
Religious organizations established in 1874
Anglican dioceses established in the 19th century
1874 establishments in Texas
Province 7 of the Episcopal Church (United States)